Kiwaia kostjuki is a moth in the family Gelechiidae. It was described by Povolný in 2001. It is found in Russia.

References

Kiwaia
Moths described in 2001